Casandra Morgan is an American television soap opera script writer.

Positions held
General Hospital
 Occasional Script Writer (January 2004 - March 2004)

Guiding Light
 Associate Head Writer (June 25, 2004 - October 21, 2005)

Port Charles
 Associate Head Writer (1998-2003)

Awards and nominations
Daytime Emmy Award
Nomination, 2005, Best Writing, Guiding Light

Writers Guild of America Award
Win, 2004, Best Writing, Guiding Light

External links

Year of birth missing (living people)
Living people
American soap opera writers
Writers Guild of America Award winners